Gideon Ebijitimi (born 26 November 1981 in Lagos) is a Nigerian born Romanian professional footballer, who currently plays for Millenium Giarmata.

Career 
The striker played his professional debut in the Romanian Liga I on 11 August 2001 in the game of his club Oțelul Galați against UM Timişoara. After on season was released and he played than with the clubs 
Apulum Alba Iulia, Minaur Zlatna, Petrolul Ploiesti, FC Vaslui, CSM Reșița, Forex Brașov, Corvinul Hunedoara, CS Minerul Lupeni, FC Hunedoara.

Notes

1981 births
Living people
Nigerian footballers
CSM Reșița players
CSM Unirea Alba Iulia players
Nigerian expatriate footballers
Association football forwards
Expatriate footballers in Romania
Sportspeople from Lagos
FC Vaslui players
Nigerian expatriate sportspeople in Romania
FC Petrolul Ploiești players
Association football midfielders
Liga I players
ASC Oțelul Galați players
CS Minerul Lupeni players
CS Corvinul Hunedoara players
Romanian footballers